Mathias Woo Yan Wai (Chinese: 胡恩威; born 1968) joined the arts collective Zuni Icosahedron in 1988 and is now the Executive Director cum Co-Artistic Director of the group. Woo is renowned for his creative career in multimedia theatre as a scriptwriter, director, designer, producer as well as curator with a portfolio of more than 70 original theatre works, which are best known for their unique rendering of space and technology.

Biography
Woo was born in Hong Kong. He studied architecture at The University of Hong Kong and Architectural Association, London. He engages in theatre and multimedia creative works, architectural designs, and scriptwriting for both theatre and movies, and is well-versed in cultural policies and arts education. 

Since the 1980s, he has been actively involving in the areas of politics, cultural policy, urban planning and social development research and public debate.  In 1996, Woo founded the Hong Kong Development and Strategic Research Centre (HKDSRC), and is also the chairperson of the organization. Over the past years, He has initiated a series of studies on arts and cultural policies, including both the 1991 & 1993 edition of "In Search of Cultural Policy", "In Search of Film Policy 97" and "In Search of Information Policy 97".

Woo has been writing regularly for newspapers and magazines on architecture, arts, culture, and the media since the 1990s. His writings could be seen in publications like Yazhou Zhoukan, HK Economic Times, Ming Pao and CUP Magazine.

From 2011 to 2014, Woo was commissioned by Hong Kong Asia TV to produced and hosted a series of  current and political affairs TV talk shows, included I Want to Be Chief Executive and Asia Policy Unit, and produced/Directed Political Comedy "East Wing West Wing TV".

In 2006, Woo was appointed by the government of the HKSAR as a member of Public Service Broadcasting Review Committee, and also a member of the Advisory Groups (Performing Arts and Tourism) of the Consultative Committee on the Core Arts and Cultural Facilities of the West Kowloon Cultural District; in 2009, Woo was appointed member of the Task Force on Economic Challenges by the Chief Executive and in 2010-2015 he was a member of Hong Kong-Taiwan Cultural Co-operation Committee.  He is currently the deputy supervisor of HKICC Lee Shau Kee School of Creativity. He is the board member of Ko Lui Secondary School.

In 2018, Woo was appointed as a member of Jiangsu Provincial Committee of the Chinese People’s Political Consultative Conference.

Theatre 
Woo joined Zuni Icosahedron since 1988. Over the years he has created more than 70 theatre works.  He is particularly outstanding in his creation of the Multimedia Music Theatre Series, which is a conglomeration of dexterous uses of theatre space, texts, video images and cutting-edge multimedia technologies. His endeavours in this music theatre series are groundbreaking, and his attempt in such theatre productions is the first of its kind in Hong Kong. Stan Lai once said: "To know where the trend goes, you just need to find out where Mathias Woo is." Woo's works have been presented around the world in cities like Beijing, Nanjing, Shanghai, Suzhou, Wuzhen, Macau, Taipei, Tokyo, Singapore, Berlin, Brussels, Milan and Krakow of Poland.

Woo’s theatre works cover a wide range of topics, such as literature, history, politics and current affairs, architecture and religion. His major works include 1587, A Year of No Significance (an adaptation from historian Ray Huang’s book of the same title), Eighteen Springs, Hua-Yen Sutra (a new media pictorial of Buddhist’s ancient text), East Wing West Wing (a political satire series), Kunqu opera Tang Xianzhu’s Dream on Dreams and A Tale of The Forbidden City. 

Woo pioneered the “multimedia architecture music theatre series”, like The Architecture of The City (inspired by the same title of Aldo Rossi), The Life and Time of Louis I. Kahn became the hallmark in the scene of Chinese theatre. He also created multimedia performances, such as Hua-yen Sutra, integrating Buddhist doctrines with interactive multimedia and elements of contemporary arts. They were great successes merging theatre spaces and the multi-media together, exploring the potentials of these features to the fullest. They infuse new dynamic into Hong Kong performing arts, and are vanguards in the history of Chinese theatre.

East Wing West Wing, a political comedy series exploring and discussing the political situation in Hong Kong, is very popular among the public and top government officials. Together with “the social theatre series”- The Agent and All You Want to Complain about Hong Kong TV, a Three-letter Opera which discusses the education policy of Hong Kong, reflecting his critical views and comments on various social issues and my passion in promoting civil education

Theatre Works 

 "Read Sing Eileen Chang" (2020)
 "Bach is Heart Sutra" (2020)
 "Piano Solo Storytelling Spirits" (2020)
 "BAUHAUS Magic Flute Playground" Zhuhai Tour (2019)
 "Rotten Big Ass" (2019)
 "Blind Musician Dou Wun" (2019)
 "In Praise of Shadows" (2019)
 "God or No God" (2019)
 "STEAM - The Four Great Inventions" (2019)
 “The Architecture of the City”(2019 Hong Kong, Shanghai)
 “A Sentimental Journey - The Rebecca Pan Tribute Concert”(2019 co-directed with Danny Yung) 
 “BAUHAUS Magic Flute Playground”(2018)
 “Plan HK Better!”(2018)
 “First Lessons in Heart Sutra”(2018)
 “Blind Musician Dou Wun”(2018)
 “BAUHAUS Magic Flute”(2017)
 “Freespace Tech Lab - Wittgenstein”(2017), Impromptu Performance”(2017), In Search of Lost Time”(2017)
 “The Architecture of the City”(2017)
 “Buddhist Chants in Scent and Light”(2017, 2016)
 “Hua-yen Sūtra - Purification Practices”(2017, 2016)
 “Mahjong History Theatre: Death of Old China”(2016)
 “Love Like Whisky”(2016)
 “Lord Guan Yu on Stage” Guoguang Opera Company (2017, 2016 )
 “Wittgenstein”(2016)
 “The Book of Changes”(2015)
 “Red Rose, White Rose”(2016, 2014, Hong Kong 2015 Shanghai)
 “Dream Illusion Bubble Shadow”Dance Forum (2014 Taipei, Hong Kong)
 “Hua-Yen Sutra 3.0 – Pu Xian's Virtuous Actions for Awakening”(2013)
 “The Kimchi Dream”(2013)
 “The Divine Comedy Of Capitalism”(2012)
 “18 Springs”(2012 Hong Kong, 2013 Singapore, 2014 Macau)
 “Railway is like a Long, Winding Recollection”(2011)
 “One Hundred years of Chinese Architecture” (2011 Hong Kong, 2015 Millan )
 “Remembrance of Karaoke Past”(2010 Hong Kong, 2011 Shanghai)
 “A Memory Palace of Matteo Ricci”(2010)
 “Looking for Mies – God is in the Details”(2009, 2011)
 “The Heart of Bach”(2009)
 “Corbu and Kahn”(2009)
 “A Tale of the Forbidden City”(2009, 2010, 2013, 2017 Hong Kong，2012 Suzhou)
 “The Forbidden City”(2009)
 “East Wing West Wing 8 West Kowloon Dragon Ball”(2009)
 “The Ultimate Review on HK TV”(2009)
 “God Came to China”(2008)
 “The Life and Times of Louis I. Kahn”(2008 Taipei)
 “Hua-Yen Sutra: Minds as Skillful Painter” (2008 Taipei)
 “East Wing West Wing 6- Rainbow Judge Pao”(2008)
 “Tang Xianzu's Dream on Dreams”(2007 Nanjing, 2008 Hong Kong, 2009 Brussel, 2017 Hong Kong)
 “All you want to Complain about Hong Kong TV”(2007)
 “Hua-yen Sutra”(2007)
 “The Life and Times of Louis I. Kahn”(2007Hong Kong, 2008 Taipei, 2010 Shanghai)
 “1587, a Year of No Significance”(2006, 2008, 2010, 2015 Hong Kong, 2012 Taipei, 2014 Wuzhen)
 “Hong Kong Style”(2006)
 “Three-letter Opera”(2006)
 “The Agent”(2005, 2010)
 “Fragments d'un discours amoureux”(2005, Taipei, co-directed with Edward Lam)
 “Corbu”(2005)
 “The Great Entertainer”(2005 co-directed with Edward Lam)
 “2004: A Hong Kong Odyssey”(2004)
 “18 Springs”(2003, 2004, 2005 co-directed with Edward Lam)
 “Good Wind Like Water”(2003 co-directed with Danny Yung)
 “A Lover's Discourse”(2003)
 “The Ninth Year of One Hundred Years of Solitude: 9”(2002)
 “Looking for Mies”(2002)
 “Eat, Money, Man, Woman and the Importance of Being Vulgar”(2002 co-directed with Edward Lam)
 “Sigmund Freud in Search of Chinese Master and Mind”（2016, 2002, 2003 co-directed with Danny Yung）
 “The Life and Times of Louis I. Kahn”(2001, 2002)
 “2001 a Hong Kong Odyssey”(2000)
 “Four Grand inventions”(2000 co-directed with Danny Yung)
 “Vanity Fair”(2000 co-directed with Danny Yung)
 “1587, a Year of No Significance”(1999)
 “Die Zauberflote”(1998 co-directed with Danny Yung)
 “Romance of the Rock 97”(1997 co-directed with Danny Yung)
 “People Mountain People Sea Concert” (1997)
 “The Blue and Brown Book”(1996)
 “The Legend”(1995 co-directed with Edward Lam, Danny Yung, Joe Lau)
 “Invisible Cities 2 - Seven Wonders of the World”(1993)
 “Ten Commandments”(1992)
 “Super Metal”(1991)
 “Swimmer - Memories of C”(1991)

Multi-Media and Stage Design 
He has also collaborated with National Class One Kunqu artists such as Zhang Hong, Shi Xiaomei, Ke Jun and Zhang Jun. In 2016, he was invited by Guoguang Opera Company of Taiwan to direct and design the experimental Peking opera Lord Guan Yu on Stage. He has also worked with theatre veterans including Stan Lai, Edward Lam, Meng Jinghui on multimedia stage design. 

 “Lord Guan Yu on Stage” Guoguang Opera Company (2017, 2016 Taipei)
 “The Painting of 18 Lohans” Guoguang Opera Company (2015 Taipei)
 “Like Shadows” Performance Workshop (2008 Taipei)
 “HJPO vs Anthony Wong Live: Bauhinian Rhapsody” Hong Kong Philharmonic Orchestra (2006 Hong Kong)
 “ Four Season Plus” Hong Kong Sinfonietta (2004 Hong Kong)
 “Dressed Up Again for the Opera” A Charity Performance Commemorating the 15th Anniversary of the Death of Ms. Yam Kim Fai (2004)
 “Mumble Jumble” Performance Workshop (2003 Taipei)
 “Happy Prince” Edward Lam Dance Theatre (2003 Hong Kong & Taipei)
 “Head without Tail” National Theatre of China, Meng Jinghui（2002 Beijing)
 “18 Ways to Say Goodbye” Edward Lam Dance Theatre (2002)
 “Solos - Experimenting Traditional Chinese Operas” (2002)

Architecture and Designs
In 2004, in association with Arch Design Architects Ltd., Woo designed the Shantou University Student Activity Centre Phase I project and won the Hong Kong Institute of Architects’ 2004 Award for Members’ Work Outside of Hong Kong.
In 2004, Woo was invited by Eslite Book Store of Taipei to create a multi-media sound installation Migrating Birds.
In 2001, Woo worked with Mr Rocco Sen Kee YIM, and was awarded an honorable mention in the West Kowloon Reclamation Concept Proposal Competition.

Exhibition: National Arts Education Programme (Chief Curator) 
“The Book of Changes: Qian”(2015)
“One Hundred Years of Chinese Railway Architecture”(2011)
“Ink Design Living: Ink Pond” – Si Shu Xi (2010)
“Ink Design Living: Calligraphy, Music and Poetry Performances (2010)
“Ink Design Living╳Beyond O Series, Cross-media and Cross-genre Creative Collaborations (2010)
“I Want to Learn Calligraphy” Calligraphy Works Collaborations (2010)
“The Forbidden City” (2009)

Architecture is Art Festival 
Architecture is Art Festival (Artistic Director)

In 2009, Woo initiated Architecture is Art Festival, the first of its kind themed on architecture in Hong Kong, which re-examines architecture from an artistic point of view, manifesting various artistic possibilities of architecture with different forms.  He has been the Artistic Director for all the festivals held in Hong Kong (2009, 2013, 2015, 2017, 2019).

Theatre Technology 
In 2017, Woo created Freespace Tech Lab and Z Innovation Lab in 2018 respectively, projects that explored the forefront stage technology and manifesting the diversity of possibilities in black box theatre. 

 Z Innovation Lab 2020 (Chief Curator, Artistic Director and Spatial Designer) Presented by Zuni Icosahedron
 Z Innovation Lab 2019 (Chief Curator, Artistic Director and Spatial Designer) Presented by Zuni Icosahedron
 Z Innovation Lab 2018 (Chief Curator, Artistic Director and Spatial Designer) Presented by Zuni Icosahedron
 Freespace Tech Lab 2017 (Chief Curator, Artistic Director and Spatial Designer) Co-organizer by Zuni Icosahedron and West Kowloon Cultural District

Publications 
Woo has been writing regularly for newspapers and magazines on architecture, arts, culture, and the media since the 1990s. 

Mathias Woo on Cultural Policy Talk (2016)
Cultural Vision 03 Bilingual Cultural Journal(2013)
Cultural Vision 02 Bilingual Cultural Journal(2013)
Cultural Vision 01 (2012)
Hong Kong Style (2012)
The Deep Structure of Hong Kong Culture (2012)
Cultural Vision (Trial Version)(2011)
Hong Kong Is Its Own Enemy (2009)
Cultural Opportunities in Economic Crisis? (2009)
Mathias Woo Hong Kong Odyssey (2009)
Good Wind Like Water (2008)
East Wing West Wing Comic (2008) (Collaborated with comic artist, Lai Tat-tat Wing)
West Kowloon Blueprint (2007)
HK Style 3 –A City should be Built This Way (2007)
HK Style 2 – Destroy HK (2006)
HK Style (2005)
Hong Kong Odyssey, 2001

Screenplays
 In 2008, Run Papa Run, the screenplay Woo co-wrote with Chan Suk Yin and Sylvia Chang, was nominated as the Best Screenplay in the 28th Hong Kong Films Award.
 In 2007, Happy Birthday, the screenplay Woo co-wrote with Sylvia Chang, was nominated as the Best Screenplay in the 26th Hong Kong Films Award.

Awards 
 In 2020, Z Innovation Lab 2019 was awarded “The Red Dot Award : Brand & Communication Design 2020.” 
 In 2019, The Architecture of The City was awarded the “Silver A'Design Award in Performing Arts, Style and Scenery Design Category.”
 In 2018, The Architecture of The City was awarded the DFA Design for Asia Awards by the Hong Kong Design Centre.
 In 2013, Woo was awarded the “Shenzhen-Hong Kong Life Award: Arts and Culture Figure of the Year Award” by Southern Metropolis Daily.
 In 2012, Looking for Mies was awarded the DFA Design for Asia Awards by the Hong Kong Design Centre.
 In 2004, in association with Arch Design Architects Ltd., Woo designed the Shantou University Student Activity Centre Phase I project and won the Hong Kong Institute of Architects’ 2004 Award for Members’ Work Outside of Hong Kong.

External links
 Mathias Woo Blog (Hong Kong)
 Mathias Woo Blog (Mainland China)

Chinese designers
Living people
Year of birth missing (living people)